Indori may refer to:

Rahat Indori (1950–2020), Indian Bollywood lyricist and Urdu language poet 
Indori Poha, a type of flattened rice
Indori fort, in Maharashtra, India
Indori river, in Rajasthan, India
Indori Ishq, a 2021 Indian web series

See also 
 Indore (disambiguation)